Rookies' Diary is a comedy television series created in Taiwan. It has a total of 43 episodes of approximately 1 hour each. It aired from July 2, 2010 to April 22, 2011. The series is about how a group of teenagers trains in the military office for 36 days. During these 36 days, they work really hard. They made new friends and had lot of fun. Even though, they still worked hard and became more mature when they left the military service of 36 days. The director of the series is Wang Wei. He is a really successful Taiwanese director around the world.

This series had a second season, in which some of the cadets continued their military service at a higher level. In this military service, training was a lot harder and as you watched more you laughed more. As mentioned before, it is a comedy so during the series there were a lot of scenes in which the actors made you laugh until you cry.

Cast

Officers and NCOs

Lee Hsing-wen as Captain Ding Hao 丁浩
Yao Yuanhao as Second Lieutenant Sun An Bang 孙安邦
Chantel Liu as Sergeant First Class Wang Sheng Nan 王胜男
Huang Ti Chun "Debbie" as Lieutenant Jin Bi Ying 金碧莹
Zhao Jun Ya as Corporal Wang Wei 王威
Pang Yong Zhi as Corporal Yu Shan Ren 余善仁
Lin Ruo Ya as Second Lieutenant Qiu Jing Wen
Jun Hao Wang as Corporal Neng Zhi Li
Jacky Zhu as Captain Xu Jia Cheng
Peng An Li as Lieutenant Colonel Kai Zhong Chen
Shi Peng Shen as Lieutenant Colonel Hui Huang Yu
Dong Yu Xie as Corporal Zong Yuan Wang

Rookies

Tang Jia Hao as Luo Gang 罗刚
Fu Zi Chun as Yang Hai Shen 杨海生
Chen De Lie as Lin Bo Wen 林博文
Lin Dao Yuan  as Lai Hu 赖虎
Xie Zheng Hao as Cai Hao Zhi 蔡浩志
Chen Wen Xiang as Qiu You Shun 邱有順
Pan Bo Xi as Shi Jun 石俊
Qian Jun Zhong  as Ye Da Tong 叶大同
Xia Zheng Feng  as Wu Yong 吴勇
A Gan  as Chen Tian Bin 陈添彬
Ai Cheng  as Xiao De Ji 萧德基

Others

Kelly Pai as Tian Xing
Su Yan Pei as Cai Zhen Zhu
Zhang Jia Xin  as Liu Su Qing
Akio Chen as Luo Dao Chun
Zhang Qin as Shen Gui Mei
Lin Yi Fang as Lai Mu Chun
Mei Fang as Gu Zhui Ma
Lin Mie Zhao as Shen Mei Yu
 as Cai Zhen Cai
Ye Jia Yu as Zheng Yu Ting
Chen Bo Han as A Hou
Li Jia Wen as Di Qiu
Tang Zhen as Yan Xiao Rou
Achel Chang as Ye Xiao Yan
Yue Hong as Zheng Yu Que
Liu Xiao Yi as Huang Li Hong
Du Shi Mei as Jian Pu Pu
Li Guo Chao as Li Ming Jie
Chen Ming Wei as Chen Hao Nan
Yang Li-yin as Yan Xiu Ru

References

https://www.viki.com/tv/3858c-rookies-diary
2010 Taiwanese television series debuts